Dyschirius latipennis is a species of ground beetle in the subfamily Scaritinae. It was described by Seidlitz in 1867.

References

latipennis
Beetles described in 1867